Fairford is a small market town in Gloucestershire, England. Nearby are RAF Fairford and the Cotswold Water Park.

History

Middle Ages 
Evidence of settlement in Fairford dates back to the 9th century and it received a royal market grant in the 12th century. In the Domesday Book, Fairford was listed as Fareforde. In 1066 there were three mills in the town, one of which was still used in the wool trade by the 13th century. The mill that survives today was built in the 17th century.

Both Edward I and Henry VIII were royal visitors to the town in 1276 and 1520 respectively.

17th and 18th century 
Fairford Park, to the north of the town, was made part of the grounds of the manor house built by Andrew Barker in the 1660s. It would later be turned into a deer park with an obelisk built to mark the edge of the grounds. The park remained in the Barker family until it was sold to Earnest Cook in 1945.

In 1755, seven innkeepers were licensed in Fairford. The first recording of an inn had been in 1419 and this grew over the centuries owing to Fairford's location as a connecting town between larger metropolitan areas. Stagecoach routes often called at Fairford before travelling on to Gloucester, Cirencester, Bristol, Oxford and London.

19th and 20th century 

During the Swing Riots in the 1830s, farming machinery being manufactured in Fairford was destroyed by protestors.

RAF Fairford was constructed in 1944 as a joint British and American base. 

From 1947-1959, Fairford housed 1,200 Polish people in The Displaced Persons Camp who had been displaced due to the Second World War. The site had originally been an American Air Force hospital that was built during the war. The buildings were then repurposed for the camp before being demolished in 1977.

Governance
Fairford has a Parish Council with 13 members. The mayor is James Nicholls.

After a boundary review implemented for the 2015 local elections, Fairford was split into two District Council electoral wards called Fairford North Ward (single member) and Lechlade, Kempsford and Fairford South Ward (two member). On Cotswold District Council Fairford North Ward is represented by Liberal Democrat Andrew Doherty and Lechlade, Kempsford and Fairford South Ward is represented by Conservative Councillors Stephen Andrews and Sue Coakley.

The town is represented on Gloucestershire County Council by Conservative Councillor Ray Theodoulou who represents the Fairford and Lechlade on Thames Division.

Fairford North Ward

Lechlade, Kempsford and Fairford South Ward

Fairford and Lechlade on Thames Division

The ward population at the 2011 census was 4,031.

Churches

St Mary's Church

The Church of England parish church of Saint Mary is renowned for its complete set of medieval stained glass, stone carvings and misericords. Rebuilt in the early 1490s by the wool merchant John Tame (d.1500), the church is an example of late Perpendicular Gothic architecture that is characterised by slim stone window mullions and light but strong buttresses. The style enabled larger windows than previously, allowing much more light into the building. Grade 1 listed by English Heritage, its structure and details remains unaltered since built.

Stained glass, St Mary's Church

St. Mary's is of national historical and architectural importance because it houses the most complete set of mediaeval stained glass windows in the country, attributed to Barnard Flower. The glass survived the Reformation when many images in English churches were destroyed. In 1642, during the Civil War, they narrowly avoided destruction when the Roundhead army was marching on the nearby town of Cirencester.

Some of the panes were damaged during a storm in November 1703 and those were repaired and modified or replaced. A conservation and restoration programme began in 1988 and finished in 2010. Clear glass now protects the old glass.

Churchyard, St Mary's Church
The churchyard includes a stone memorial to Tiddles, the church cat who fell off the church roof. There is also a stone grotesque to commemorate a young boy who climbed up the walls of the church and jumped, falling to his death. The churchyard contains eight Commonwealth war graves; three British Army soldiers, a Royal Navy seaman and a Royal Air Force airman of World War I and two British soldiers and a Home Guardsman of World War II.

St Thomas' of Canterbury
Fairford has a 19th-century Catholic church of St Thomas of Canterbury. Following the closure of the recusant chapel at Hatherop Castle in 1844, a church was built at Horcott (Fairford) the following year at a cost of £700. The first Mass was celebrated in 1845, five years before the Restoration of the Hierarchy in England and before the creation of the Roman Catholic Diocese of Clifton. The stained glass window behind the altar depicts St. Thomas of Canterbury in the centre panel, showing the date 1845. The adjoining Presbytery was built 20 years later to designs by Benjamin Bucknall, the architect of Woodchester Mansion. The church contains an organ by Hill and stained glass by William Wailes, Hardman and Geoffrey Robinson. The two windows in the porch were added to commemorate the 150th anniversary of the first Mass. The left window depicts the crest of the de Mauley family; that on the right depicts the Eucharist.

Fairford United Church
In 1981 a group of local Methodists approached the local Congregational Church to use the chapel for their services as there was no Methodist Church in Fairford. They were officially united into one congregation in 1986 and the present church follows the traditions of both the Methodist Church and the Congregational Federation.

The churches in and around Fairford are represented by the organisation Churches Together Around Fairford (CTAF) which has meetings and organises services of unity.

Education
The town's secondary school is Farmor's School, an 11-18 co-educational academy. The school was judged to be of outstanding standard, having achieved Grade 1 in its Ofsted inspection in 2010. After becoming an academy it achieved lower grades from the board over the years: "Good", "Requires Improvement" and "Good" again in 2013, 2017 and 2021 respectively.

There is also a primary school (Fairford Primary), and a playgroup. Coln House School was a 9-16, residential/day, state special school. After being put into special measures following a 2016 Ofsted report, the school closed in March 2017. Built in 1822 by Alexander Ilse as a private asylum called The Retreat, it closed in 1944 before becoming a school in 1949.

Transport
Fairford was formerly linked to Oxford by the Witney Railway and its extension the East Gloucestershire Railway. The route was active between 1873-1962. There have been reports that part of the old track could be cleared of accumulated mountains of detritus and overgrown trees to be re-opened as a cycle path. There is a bus service to Cirencester and Lechlade, from where travellers can transfer to another bus and travel onwards to Swindon.

Events

Air Tattoo 
For three days every year RAF Fairford hosts the world's largest military air show – the Royal International Air Tattoo. The event brings a boost to the economy of the town and surrounding areas.

Demonstrations 
In March 2003 'Flowers to Fairford' was held as a protest against the use of USAF Fairford as the base for the 14 B-52 bombers aircraft which were used to bomb Iraq as part of Operation Desert Storm. Several thousand people attended and there was a large police presence, but the event passed off peacefully. Other people intending to protest experienced an incident, with the police's actions resulting in a court case. The Fairford Coach Action group stated that:"On 22 March 2003, the police used surprisingly extreme tactics to prevent more than 120 activists from reaching [the] legally sanctioned anti-war demonstration in Fairford, (Gloucestershire, UK). The demonstration outside a US Airforce Base in Fairford was well attended with estimates of up to 5,000 activists attending. Among the scheduled speakers on the day were writer George Monbiot and Caroline Lucas (MEP). The people who police prevented from attending were a diverse group with a broad range of affiliations. The main thing that they had in common was the desire to travel from London by coach and the intention of joining the legal protest in Fairford. Two of the four main scheduled speakers for the Fairford demonstration were travelling on these coaches from London. After the coaches had travelled two and a half hours from London, the coaches were stopped by police just miles from the demonstration. Using section 60 powers (of the Public Order and Criminal Justice Act 1994) police searched the coaches for weapons for one and a half hours. The passengers cooperated with this search, and they were invited to reboard the coaches when the search concluded. No arrests were made and no items found. After all the passengers boarded, the coaches were escorted immediately back to London under a continuous 9–12 vehicle police escort."

Flooding 
In July 2007 Fairford suffered unseasonably high rainfall which led to major flooding of 64 homes on Milton Street and London Street as well as in some other surrounding areas. This meant that many of the annual events had to be cancelled.

Steam Rally 
The Ernest Cook Trust has its headquarters in Fairford Park, which used to host the annual Fairford Steam Rally and Show. The Show closed in 2015 after running for 46 years.

Sport and leisure

Fairford has a non-league football team Fairford Town F.C. who play and train at Cinder Lane. Fairford have their own rugby team FRFC, playing in green and black strip. The town also has the Walnut Tree Field: a large playing field and park, a cricket club (dating back to the early 1900s), a bowling, sailing and water skiing club. Fairford had a leisure centre until 2019 which had been managed by Farmor's School since 2013.

Fairford also has a youth football club, based at Horcott Road which caters for children between the ages of 5 and 15 years old. The club, established in 1976, is a FA Chartered Club, run by volunteers for the benefit of local children from Fairford and surrounding villages. Teams from U8 and above play in the North Wiltshire Youth Football Leagues.

Literature
The Secret Diary of Sarah Thomas, 1860 – 1865, is a published journal by a Victorian diarist living in Fairford. It features local landmarks.

Notable people 

 Wills Hill, 1st Marquess of Downshire - (1718-1793) British politician
 John Keble - (1792-1866) Anglican priest and poet

References

Further reading

 Farmer, Oscar G. Fairford Church and its Stained Glass Windows 7th ed. 1962 (presumably self-published, printed by Harding and Curtis Ltd, Somerset Hall, Bath)
Bigland, Ralph (1791) An Account of the Parish of Fairford; ed. by Richard Bigland

External links

Fairford community website
Fairford Town CCouncil website
Fairford United Church
Fairford Youth FC
St. Mary's Church in Fairford – Sacred Destinations
St Thomas' Catholic Church website Includes history, pictures and details of services.
BBC archive film of Fairford from 1986
Local Online website for the Lechlade and Fairford community

 
Towns in Gloucestershire
Cotswold District